Thomas Del Ruth  (born May 1, 1942) is a retired American cinematographer.

Biography

Del Ruth was born in 1942 in Beverly Hills, California, as the son of film director Roy Del Ruth, and actress Winnie Lightner. His father Has a star on the hollywood blvd walk of fame, He was educated at Van Nuys High School and the University of Southern California and began working as a commercial print model and actor after serving in the US Army (1961-1965).

Del Ruth switched from being in front of the camera to being behind it in 1966 and was promoted to director of photography in 1979 by Universal Studios. Del Ruth has received two Emmy Awards for outstanding cinematography as well as five additional Emmy nominations. In addition, he has won four American Society of Cinematographers Outstanding Cinematography Awards as well as an additional six ASC nominations. Del Ruth is a member of the American Society of Cinematographers ,( ASC) as well as the Academy of Motion Picture Arts and Sciences.He has experience as  Assistant Director, film producer and director.

Del Ruth retired in 2009 to La Quinta, California.

Awards

American Society of Cinematographers

Nominations

1994 - Outstanding Achievement in Cinematography in Movies of the Week/Pilots for The X-Files
2000 - Outstanding Achievement in Cinematography in Movies of the Week/Pilots for The West Wing
2003 - Outstanding Achievement in Cinematography in Episodic TV series for The West Wing
2004 - Outstanding Achievement in Cinematography in Episodic TV series for The West Wing
2005 - Outstanding Achievement in Cinematography in Episodic TV series for The West Wing
2006 - Outstanding Achievement in Cinematography in Movies of the Week/Pilots for Code Breakers
2007 - Outstanding Achievement in Cinematography in Movies of the Week/Pilots for Studio 60 on the Sunset Strip

Wins

1995 - Outstanding Achievement in Cinematography in Movies of the Week/Pilots for ER
1995 - Outstanding Achievement in Cinematography in Regular Series for ER
1999 - Outstanding Achievement in Cinematography in Movies of the Week/Pilots for The West Wing
2002 - Outstanding Achievement in Cinematography in Movies of the Week/Pilots for The West Wing

Primetime Emmy Awards

Nominations
1995 - Outstanding Individual Achievement in Cinematography for a Miniseries or a Special for My Brother's Keeper
2002 - Outstanding Cinematography for a Single Camera Series for The West Wing
2003 - Outstanding Cinematography for a Single Camera Series for The West Wing
2004 - Outstanding Cinematography for a Single Camera Series for The West Wing
2007 - Outstanding Cinematography For a Single-camera Series for Studio 60 on the Sunset Strip

Wins
2000 - Outstanding Cinematography for a Single Camera Series for The West Wing
2001 - Outstanding Cinematography for a Single Camera Series for The West Wing

Filmography
As cinematographer unless otherwise specified

Flipped (2010) (Warner Brothers Features)
Studio 60 on the Sunset Strip (14 episodes, 2006–2007)
The Book of Daniel (2006) TV series (unknown episodes)
Code Breakers (2005) (TV) (director of photography)
Heartless (2005/I) (TV)
The West Wing (96 episodes, 1999–2004)
It Came from the Sky (1999) (film) (director of photography)
Down Will Come Baby (1999) (TV)
Charmed (7 episodes, 1998)
Kissing a Fool (1998) (director of photography)
Leave It to Beaver (1997)
When the Cradle Falls (1997) (TV)
Asteroid (1997) (TV) (director of photography) (as Tom Del Ruth)
... a.k.a. Asteroid: The Sky is Falling - Philippines (English title) (video title)
The Underworld (1997) 
Full Circle (1996) (TV) (as Tom Del Ruth)
Chasing the Dragon (1996) (TV)
JAG (13 episodes, 1995)
Courthouse (1 episode, 1995) - Pilot (1995) TV episode
Abandoned and Deceived (1995) (TV) (director of photography)
My Brother's Keeper (1995) (TV) (director of photography) (as Tom Del Ruth)
One Christmas (1994) 
... a.k.a. Truman Capote's One Christmas - USA (complete title)
ER (3 episodes, 1994) - (director of photography) 
Next Door (1994) 
Royce (1994) 
Shattered Image (1994) 
House of Secrets (1993) (TV) (as Tom Del Ruth)
Donato and Daughter (1993) (TV)
The X Files (1 episode, 1993)
... a.k.a. The X-Files - USA
... a.k.a. X-File - Japan (English title) - Pilot (1993) TV episode (director of photography) 
Barbarians at the Gate (1993) 
Amore! (1993)
T Bone N Weasel (1992) (TV)
The Mighty Ducks (1992) (director of photography)
Little Sister (1992)
Kuffs (1992) (director of photography)
Look Who's Talking Too (1990)
Look Who's Talking (1989) (director of photography)
Wolf (1989) (TV)
Dream Breakers (1989) (TV)
... a.k.a. In Evil's Grasp - USA (syndication title)
Ladykillers (1988) 
Satisfaction (1988) (director of photography)
... a.k.a. Girls of Summer - Canada (English title)
The Running Man (1987) (director of photography)
Cross My Heart (1987)
Spies (1987) TV series (unknown episodes)
Outlaws (1 episode, 1986) - Outlaws (1986) TV episode 
Who Is Julia? (1986) (TV) 
Stand by Me (1986) 
Blind Justice (1986) (TV) 
Quicksilver (1986) 
Code of Vengeance (1985)  
The Breakfast Club (1985) (director of photography) 
Fandango (1985) 
Impulse (1984) 
Best Kept Secrets (1984)  
Get Crazy (1983) 
Blue Thunder (1983) (director of photography)
Intimate Agony (1983) (TV) (director of photography) 
... a.k.a. Doctor in Paradise - USA (video box title)
Hysterical (1983) 
Who Will Love My Children? (1983) (TV) 
Simon & Simon (3 episodes, 1981–1983)
 Pirate's Key: Part 1 (1983) TV episode 
 Pirate's Key: Part 2 (1983) TV episode 
 Details at Eleven (1981) TV episode (director of photography) 
In Love with an Older Woman (1982) (TV) 
Paper Dolls (1982)  
Death Wish II (1982) 
... a.k.a. Death Wish 2 - USA (DVD box title)
Million Dollar Infield (1982) (TV) 
Help Wanted: Male (1982) (TV) (director of photography) 
Elvis and the Beauty Queen (1981) (TV) 
This House Possessed (1981) (TV) 
Underground Aces (1981) 
The Wonderful World of Phillip Malley (1981) (pilot episode) 
Mark, I Love You (1980) (TV) 
Motel Hell (1980) 
She's Dressed to Kill (1979)  
The Last Convertible (1979) TV mini-series (parts 1 and 3) 
Mrs. Columbo (9 episodes, 1979) 
Crash (1978) (camera operator) (as Tom Del Ruth) 
Big Wednesday (1978) (camera operator) 
Wheels (1978) TV mini-series (camera operator) 
It Happened One Christmas (1977) (TV) (camera operator)  
Three Warriors (1977) (camera operator) 
Handle with Care (1977) (camera operator) 
Testimony of Two Men (1977) TV mini-series (camera operator) 
The Shootist (1976) (camera operator) (as Tom Del Ruth) 
The Outlaw Josey Wales (1976) (camera operator) (as Tom Del Ruth) 
Sparkle (1976) (camera operator) 
The Duchess and the Dirtwater Fox (1976) (camera operator) 
Gable and Lombard (1976) (camera operator)  
Smile (1975) (camera operator) (as Tom Del Ruth) 
Coonskin (1975) (camera operator) 
... a.k.a. Bustin' Out - USA (reissue title)
... a.k.a. Street Fight - USA (video title)
The Day of the Locust (1975) (camera operator) 
Aloha Bobby and Rose (1975) (camera operator) 
... a.k.a. Aloha, Bobby and Rose - USA (poster title)
The Front Page (1974) (camera operator)  
Zandy's Bride (1974) (assistant camera) 
... a.k.a. For Better, for Worse - USA (TV title)
Melvin Purvis: G-Man (1974) (TV) (camera operator) 
Electra Glide in Blue (1973) (assistant camera)  
Birds of Prey (1973) (TV) (assistant camera)  
Play It as It Lays (1972) (assistant camera) 
Cry for Me, Billy (1972) (assistant camera) 
Fat City (1972) (assistant camera)  
Brewster McCloud (1970) (assistant camera) 
Tora! Tora! Tora! (1970) (assistant camera: second unit)  
Myra Breckinridge (1970) (assistant camera) 
The Happy Ending (1969) (assistant camera)  
Butch Cassidy and the Sundance Kid (1969) (assistant camera) 
Justine (1969) (assistant camera) 
The Secret Life of an American Wife (1968) (assistant camera) 
Bandolero! (1968) (assistant camera)  
The Detective (1968) (assistant camera) 
Planet of the Apes (assistant camera)  
Peyton Place (1964) TV series (assistant camera) (unknown episodes, 1967) 
Valley of the Dolls (1967) (assistant camera)  
Doctor Dolittle (1967) (assistant camera)  
Divorce American Style (1967) (assistant camera)  
Tobruk (1967) (assistant camera: second unit)  
Batman (1966) TV series (assistant camera) (unknown episodes, 1966) 
The Sand Pebbles (1966) (second assistant camera)

Actor:
Cinema Scene (2005) (V) .... Guest

Director:
JAG (1 episode, 1996), Sightings (1996) pilot episode, (as Tom Del Ruth)

Producer:
Wolf (1989) TV series (producer) ( 13 episodes)

References

External links
 Archive of American Television Thomas Del Ruth interview
 

1942 births
American cinematographers
Film producers from California
Emmy Award winners
Living people
People from Beverly Hills, California
Film directors from California
USC School of Cinematic Arts alumni